Codford Circle, also known as Wilsbury Ring, Woldsbury, and possibly Oldbury Camp, is a neolithic hill top enclosure or possible hillfort located on the summit of Codford Hill, a chalk promontory of Salisbury Plain, near to the village and civil parish of Codford, in Wiltshire, England.

Aerial photography shows signs of an inner ditch, possibly signs of a former palisade fence, and entrances on the east and west sides. The entrances on the southeast and northwest sides are later in date.

There is no archaeological evidence for occupation, and the earthworks have been interpreted as being defensively weak owing to their slight nature, therefore the site is interpreted as an enclosure of an unknown but ancient date.

See also
List of hill forts in England

References

Hill forts in Wiltshire